"Young Years" is a song by New Zealand group Dragon, released on 3 April 1989 as the second single to be released from the group's ninth studio album Bondi Road (1989). "Young Years" peaked at No. 18 on the ARIA charts and No.13 on the Recorded Music NZ charts, their final Top 40 Hit to Date.

Overview 
NZOn Screen said, "Marc is celebratory in one of his last videos with the band. Todd — bass against the bush background — is gleeful. Written by keyboard player Alan Mansfield and his partner, Kiwi singer Sharon O’Neill, ‘Young Years’ gained added poignancy following Marc Hunter’s death in 1998.

Track listing 
 Young Years (Alan Mansfield, Sharon O'Neill) – 3:56
 Runaway  (Alan Mansfield, Sharon O'Neill) – 3:49

Charts

Personnel 
 Backing vocals – Mary Azzopardi, Wendy Matthews
 Drums – Mitch Farmer
 Bass, backing vocals – Todd Hunter
 Banjo – Mark Collins
 Saxophone – Andrew Oh
 Violin – Wayne Goodwin
 Guitar – Tommy Emmanuel, Mike Caen
 Keyboards – Alan Mansfield, David Hirschfelder, Lee Borkman
 Lead and backing vocals – Marc Hunter

References 

Dragon (band) songs
Songs written by Sharon O'Neill
1989 songs
1989 singles